Applicat-Prazan gallery was established in 1993 on the Left Bank in the Saint-Germain-des-Prés area of Paris at 16 rue de Seine (75006 Paris, France) under the initiative of Bernard Prazan, a keen art collector.

Franck Prazan, Bernard Prazan's son and former managing director of Christie's in France, has been running the gallery since 2004.

In 2010 a second location was added on the Right Bank, at 14 avenue Matignon, 75008 Paris.

On the eve of its 30th anniversary, the gallery showcased from October 29th to December 17th, 2022 an exhibition entitled: Georges Mathieu, Paintings 1951-1962

Since its foundation the gallery specializes exclusively in the important post-war European painters and specifically in the most significant artists of this period such as   : Jean Dubuffet, Maurice Estève, Jean Fautrier, Hans Hartung, Jean Hélion, Wifredo Lam, Alberto Magnelli, Alfred Manessier, André Masson, Georges Mathieu, Serge Poliakoff, Jean-Paul Riopelle, Pierre Soulages, Nicolas de Staël, Maria Elena Vieira da Silva and Zao Wou-Ki.

Exhibitions 

Over the years the gallery has gained a large international recognition, thanks to its monographic or thematic exhibitions, notably:
 Soulages, major works (1996)
 Great painters, small paintings (1999)
 The School of Paris of the 50s in the year 2000 (2000)
 Schneider (2001)
 Estève, Freundlich, Poliakoff : Three masters of colours (2001)
 Estève, watercolours and charcoal (2003)
 Schneider (2006)
 Mes années 50, the collection of Alain Delon (2007)
 Présence, Silences, homage to Geer van Velde (2007)
 Poliakoff (2008)
 Atlan (2008)
 Dialogues around Pierre Soulages (2009)
 Atlan, the distempers (2010)
 Pincemin (2010)
 Jean Fautrier (2010)
 14 Matignon (2011)
 André Masson (2012)
 Alfred Manessier, Tours, Favellas and other monumental paintings (2012)
 Maurice Estève, works on paper (2013)
 Serge Poliakoff, the gallery's 20th anniversary exhibition (2013)
 Georges Mathieu (2014)
 Maurice Estève, Paintings 1929-1994 (2015)
 Zoran Music (2016)
 Le grand Œil de Michel Tapié (2018)
 Justice! 2 chefs-d’œuvre de Roger-Edgar Gillet (2019)
BBB (2019)
 Georges Mathieu, Paintings 1951-1962 (2022)

Events 
The gallery regularly participates in the following events:
 artgenève
TEFAF Maastricht
 Art Basel Hong Kong
 TEFAF New York Spring 
 Art Basel
 Frieze Masters
 Foire Internationale d'Art Contemporain
 Art Basel Miami Beach
 Paris + by Art Basel
 Fine Arts Paris & La Biennale

In 2016, Applicat-Prazan participated in Art Basel Hong Kong for the second time. The gallery showed a majority of works by Zao Wou-Ki.

In 2017, Applicat-Prazan has been selected to sell two paintings on behalf of the Museum of Modern Art, New York (MoMA)

Organisations 

The gallery is a member of the following organizations:
 Syndicat National des Antiquaires 
Comité Professionnel des Galeries d’Art

References

External links
 Applicat-Prazan website
 on Franck Prazan's blog

Art museums and galleries in Paris